This is an index of real-time strategy video games, sorted chronologically. Information regarding date of release, developer, platform, setting and notability is provided when available.

By year

List

References

Timelines of video games
Real-time strategy